Caprafico may refer to:

 Caprafico (Chieti), a frazione in the Province of Chieti, Italy
 Caprafico (Teramo), a frazione in the Province of Teramo, Italy